Sun Jiajun may refer to:

 Alien Sun (born 1974), Hong Kong-based Singaporean actress
 Sun Jiajun (cyclist) (born 1996), Chinese cyclist
 Sun Jiajun (swimmer) (born 2000), Chinese swimmer